Jitesh Sharma (born 22 October 1993) is an Indian cricketer who plays for Vidarbha in domestic cricket and Punjab Kings in the Indian Premier League. He got his maiden call-up for Indian cricket team in January 2023 against Sri Lanka for T20I series.

Domestic career
He made his List A debut on 27 February 2014, for Vidarbha in the 2013–14 Vijay Hazare Trophy. He made his first-class debut in the 2015–16 Ranji Trophy on 1 October 2015. He was the leading run-scorer for Vidarbha in the 2018–19 Vijay Hazare Trophy, with 298 runs in seven matches.

References

External links
 

1993 births
Living people
Indian cricketers
Vidarbha cricketers
People from Amravati
Punjab Kings cricketers
Wicket-keepers